Te Ahiwaru Cirikidaveta is a New Zealand rugby union player who plays for the Tasman Mako in the Bunnings NPC competition and the Fijian Drua in Super Rugby. His position of choice is Lock.

Early career 
Te Ahiwaru was born in the small East Coast town of Te Araroa in April 1998. His mother solely raised him. His father, who he didn’t meet until 2022, was born in Fiji.

Te Ahiwaru was educated in a total immersion school in Te Araroa up until year 11, 2013. He then moved to Hicks Bay High School to finish off his last two years of College.

In 2014 Te Ahiwaru was offered a full scholarship to attend St Kentigern College in Auckland for his final two years of school. From 2015 to 2016, Te Ahiwaru played in the schools top side as a number 8.

He played age group for both the East Coast and Hurricanes up until 2016 and was then selected by the Hurricanes Under 18 to travel to Christchurch and play against the Crusaders Under 18 as a curtain raiser game.

In August 2016 he was chosen in the Under 18, New Zealand Maori Development Team.

Tasman 
In September 2020 he was named in the Tasman Mako squad for the 2020 Mitre 10 Cup. Cirikidaveta played all 12 games for the Mako in the 2020 season as they went on to win their second premiership title in a row.

Super Rugby 
In September 2021 Cirikidaveta signed with the Fijian Drua for the 2022 Super Rugby Pacific season, the first season in the competition for the side.

Fiji 
In 2022 he was named in the Fiji national rugby union team for their July test matches.

References

External links
 

1998 births
Living people
Fijian Drua players
Fijian rugby union players
New Zealand rugby union players
People educated at Saint Kentigern College
Rugby union locks
Rugby union players from the Gisborne Region
Tasman rugby union players